Tug of war was introduced as a World Games sport at the first World Games in 1981 World Games in Santa Clara. It has been played at all editions since then. Two teams, in a test of strength, pull on opposite ends of a rope. The goal is to bring the rope a certain distance in one direction against the force of the opposing team’s pull. Two teams of eight, whose total mass must not exceed a class maximum weight, align themselves at opposite ends of the rope. The teams start with the rope’s center-line directly above a line marked on the ground, and once the contest has commenced, attempt to pull the other team such that the marking on the rope closest to their opponent crosses the center-line.

Men

-640 kg

-680 kg

-700 kg

-720 kg
This is a discontinued event.

Indoor -600 kg
This is a discontinued event.

Women

Indoor -520 kg

Indoor -540 kg

References

 
Sports at the World Games
World Games